Anand Aravindakshan (born 1989) is an Indian playback singer, and the 2016 title winner of Airtel Super Singer Season 5, a television-based reality singing competition in Tamil televised on Vijay TV.

Early life 
Anand did his school education from Chennai, and while in high school at Sri Sankara Senior Secondary School in Chennai, Anand started representing his school at cultural events and competition. After his graduation in commerce at Vivekananda College in Chennai, Anand completed a course in sound engineering from Soundtech Media School of Sound Engineering and Recording in Chennai and his MBA from Symbiosis College in the same city.

Reality show experience 
During this period Anand also took part in about four reality shows, where he won two shows and was announced first runner-up in the other two. He was the first runner up in the 2007 edition of Gandharva Sangeetham, a reality music show telecast by Kairali channel and in the 2008 edition of Athiradi Singer, a reality music show telecast by Sun TV. He was the title winner of the 2010 edition of Sa Re Ga Ma Pa challenge, a reality music show telecast by Zee Tamil. However, his latest reality show win in 2016 stirred up a lot of discussion and brought Anand to the limelight. This show was the fifth season of Airtel Super Singer, a television-based reality singing competition in Tamil televised on Vijay TV, and Anand was the title winner of this edition. With playback singers such as Srinivas, Unnikrishnan, Usha Uthup, and Mano judging the show, Anand was part of the top 30 contestants who were selected to participate in the various rounds. He was eliminated in the later rounds of the show but he made a comeback to the show as a wild card candidate. He was part of the top 5 in the grand finale. He was eventually announced the winner in the grand finale of the season, but this victory instantly fuelled controversial social media discussions questioning this decision, mentioning that Anand was already a playback singer. Anand later clarified his stand, and Vijay TV released a statement confirming that this rule of rejecting playback singers as candidates was not applicable for the fifth season since the rule was removed two years earlier for the Super Singer Senior category, they clarified that Anand's victory was valid.

Concerts, jingles, and other recordings 
In addition to being a playback singer, Anand has also performed on stage for concerts and live events. An Acapella piece that he released on YouTube in 2016 went viral, receiving more than 300 thousand views. In 2017, Anand released a YouTube dedication to Tamil singer Malaysia Vasudevan in 2017, which had almost 30,000 views. Another single released by him in 2016 on YouTube also had about 34000 views. Anand has also sung for some jingles, including a textile ad and New TVS Victor. Another album titled "Indha Kadhal Podhum" with Soundarya Bala Nandakumar, composed by Shravan – Jeshwanth, also gathered 48000 views on YouTube.

Personal life 
In December 2017, Anand married Paromita Banerjee, his high school sweetheart, in a Bengali-style wedding.

Discography

References 

1989 births
Living people
Tamil playback singers
Indian male playback singers
Malayalam playback singers
Singers from Kerala
21st-century Indian singers
Reality show winners
21st-century Indian male singers